The following are the telephone codes in Niger.

Calling formats
• +227 ABPQMCDU

The new National Numbering Plan (NNP) of Niger is structured as eight digits, in the following form: ABPQMCDU

In this structure, all the letters may be given values of 0 to 9. The first two digits AB identify the service or the network, while the remaining six digits PQMCDU identify the user unless some other specific meaning has been assigned.

The figure assigned to the letter A indicates the service or network, while the figure assigned to the letter B indicates the operator, the technology or the service.

Changes to the number plan in 2006

References

Niger
Telecommunications in Niger
Telephone numbers